This is a list of islands of Bulgaria.

Islands in the Danube

Aleko Island
Batin Island
Belene Island (also known as Persin Island)
Bogdan Island
Chayka Island
Devnya Island
Dobrina island
Dovlek Island
Golya Kutovo Island
Golyam Bliznak Island
Golyam Brashlen island
Golyama Barzina Island
Gradina Island
The Haiduk island
Island Bezimenen
Island Florentin
Kalimok Island
Kicha Island
Kozloduy Island
Lakat Island
Lyulyak Island
Magaritsa Island
Malak Bliznak Island
Malak Brashlen island
Malak Vardim Island
Malka Barzina Island
Milka Island
Mishka Island
Oreh island
Palets Island
Pozharevski ostrovi (Golyam Pozharevo and Malak Pozharevo)
Predel Island
Radetski Island
Skomen Island
Timok Island
Tsibar island
Tsibritsa Island
Tutrakan Island
Vardim Island
Vazhetoarya Island
Vetren Island

Islands in the Black Sea

St. Anastasia Island (formerly Bolshevik Island)
St. Cyricus Island
St. Ivan Island
St. Peter Island
St. Thomas Island (also known as Snake Island, not to be confused with another Snake Island, also in the Black Sea)

See also
List of islands

Bulgaria
Islands